Kong Jun (born July 1964) is a lieutenant general (zhongjiang) of the People's Liberation Army (PLA) serving as commander of the Eastern Theater Command Ground Force, succeeding Lin Xiangyang in December 2021. Previously he served as commander of the People's Liberation Army Navy Marine Corps. He is a delegate to the 13th National People's Congress.

Biography
Kong was born in Hanjiang County (now Hanjiang District, Yangzhou), Jiangsu, in July 1964. He served in the Nanjing Military Region for a long time. In January 2016, he became chief of staff of the 12th Group Army, replacing Zheng Min. In April 2017, he was appointed commander of the newly founded People's Liberation Army Navy Marine Corps, he remained in that position until December 2021, when he was commissioned as commander of the Eastern Theater Command Ground Force.

References

1964 births
Living people
People from Yangzhou
People's Liberation Army generals from Zhejiang
Delegates to the 13th National People's Congress